Ann Eriksson is a Canadian author and biologist who resides in British Columbia.

Bibliography
Decomposing Maggie (2003) 
In The Hands Of Anubis (2009)

References

External links
 Author's website
 In The Hands Of Anubis Available Online

Living people
1956 births
21st-century Canadian novelists
Canadian women novelists
People from Shaunavon, Saskatchewan
Canadian environmentalists
Canadian women environmentalists
Writers from Saskatchewan
21st-century Canadian women writers